Galeoctopus lateralis, the sharkclub octopus, is a species of octopus, from the family Octopodidae. This species was described in 2004 from specimens collected at depths of 200–400 m in the southern and western Pacific Ocean. It is a small octopus in which the mature male's have a distinctive ligula which superficially resembles a shark's jaw and head including teeth‐like lugs. Other distinguishing characteristics include a lateral mantle ridge, a skin sculpture which includes star-shaped papillae, and the females have oviducts with hare distally swollen.

References

Octopuses
Cephalopod genera
Molluscs described in 2004